Maravillas literally means "wonders", "marvels" in Spanish. It may refer to:

Maravillas, a ward (barrio) of Madrid
Maravillas (film), a 1981 Spanish film
Maravillas (Mexibús), a BRT station in Nezahualcóyotl, Mexico
Town Maravillas, or Wondertown, a fictional Cuban town from the 1991 Cuban film  Alice in Wondertown
María de las Maravillas de Jesús, (1891-1974) Spanish Carmelite, saint
Patio Maravillas, an artivist squat in Madrid
Maravillas Lamberto, a victim of White Terror during the Spanish Civil War
Maravillas Rojo, Catalan politician
Maravillas Creek, Texas
Maravillas de Colombia S.A., Colombian manufacturer of fireworks

See also
Maravilla (disambiguation)